Björn Beerschwenger (born 9 October 1991) is a German male canoeist who won eight medals at senior level at the Wildwater Canoeing World Championships and European Wildwater Championships.

References

External links
 
 

1991 births
Living people
German male canoeists
Sportspeople from Cologne